Giacomo Anziani (Ravenna, 1681 - 1723) was an Italian architect, painter, and engraver, active in a late-baroque style.

Biography
He was a follower of Carlo Cignani. He made paintings of Santi Mauro, Placido, and San Felice with the Virgin for the now extinct church of San Giovanni Evangelista. He painted, along with his pupil Domenico Capaci, an altarpiece in the presbytery of Sant'Apollinare Nuovo in Ravenna. In 1723, he helped design the Teatro Communale, built posthumously.

References

17th-century Italian painters
Italian male painters
18th-century Italian painters
1681 births
1723 deaths
People from Ravenna
Italian Baroque painters
18th-century Italian male artists